Weird Genius is an Indonesian DJ and record production group based Pop music, EDM, and synth-pop consisting of three members are Reza Oktovian, Eka Gustiwana, and Gerald Liu. This group was formed in 2016 and released their first song in 2017 with the title DPS.

History 
Weird Genius started composing music together in 2016. Previously, they already had their respective projects. As soon as they decided to join, all their abilities poured fully into this collaborative endeavor. They take inspiration from anywhere about love to life, social to gaming. When asked about the description of Weird Genius' music, they described it as hard, upbeat, pumping, crazy-drop. This style of music that they deliberately built from the beginning.

However. on 25 September 2019, Billy Taner decided to leave the group and was eventually replaced by Gerald Liu.

On 28 February 2020, Weird Genius release the song "Lathi" featuring Sara Fajira on YouTube and viral at social media specially on TikTok. Some of Weird Genius's achievements with their song "Lathi" in 2020 include: #1 on Spotify Indonesia Top 50, #2 on Spotify Viral Top 50 Global, #1 on Spotify Viral Top 50 Indonesia, #1 in iTunes Indonesia Top 200, #1 in Deezer Indonesia Top 300, #1 in JOOX Indonesia Top 100, #1 on Resso Top 30 Global, #1 on Resso Indonesia Top 20, #1 on TikTok Global 20, on #1 Shazam Chart Indonesia and topped song dates on some of the top radio stations in major cities in Indonesia.

On 30 June 2020, Spotify released a press release stating that the song "Lathi" has broken a new record as a local song that has topped the # 1 longest chart for 6 consecutive weeks on Spotify Indonesia's Top 50 Chart.

On 31 July 2020, Weird Genius have collaboration single with several international DJs to collaborate on music, including Yellow Claw featuring Reikko with the title track "Hush".

On 18 August 2020, Weird Genius officially signed with American record label Astralwerks for international music activities.

Weird Genius won Best of the Best Production Work, Best Sound Production Team, and Best Male/Female Solo Artist/Group/Dance Collaboration for the song "Lathi" at the 23rd Anugerah Musik Indonesia on 26 November 2020. The day after that, they released a collaborative song with League of Legends: Wild Rift, called "All In" and for vocals they collaborated with Singaporean singer, Tabitha Nauser.

On 4 December 2020, Weird Genius released a remixed version of "Lathi" consisting of three remixes by R3hab, Sihk, and RayRay.

On 5 February 2021, they released "Last Summer", a collaboration with Tokyo Machine and Canadian singer Lights via Monstercat. The accompanying animated music video for the track was later released on 24 May 2021.

On 10 September 2021, Weird Genius released "Future Ghost" featuring Thai-Belgian singer Violette Wautier.

Members
Current
Reza Oktovian, born 15 October  1987 – Songwriter and rapper (2016 – present)
Eka Gustiwana, born 1 August 1989 – Record producer, keyboardist and synthesizer (2016 – present)
Gerald Liu, born 10 February 1996 – Record producer and DJ mixer (2019 – present)

Former
Billy Taner, born 10 March 1994 – Record producer and DJ mixer (2016 – 2019)

Discography

Singles

Remix albums

Remixes

Concerts and tours

Headlining
 Velvet Thorns Tour (2019)
 Lathi Tour (2020)

Co-headlining
 Viral Fest Asia Festival Bangkok (2017)
 Soundrenaline Bali (2017)
 Yellow Claw’s Indonesian Tour (2018) 
 Sky Garden Bali (2018) 
 The Chainsmokers Live in Concert Jakarta (2018) 
 SHVR Jakarta (2018 & 2019)

Awards and achievements

References

External links
 

Indonesian DJs
Musical groups reestablished in 2016
Indonesian dance music groups
Electronic dance music DJs
Astralwerks artists